Buckingham Gate is a street in Westminster, London, England, near Buckingham Palace.

Location

At the north-west end is a junction with Buckingham Palace Road and Birdcage Walk opposite Buckingham Palace. At the south-east end is a junction with Victoria Street. The Wellington Barracks are to the north-east. The street is designated as part of the B323 road.

Transport

The nearest London Underground stations are London Victoria station and St James's Park tube station; both are close to the south-east end of the street.

History
The Buckingham Gate drill halls stood at No. 58 and No. 59. No. 59 was the regimental headquarters of the London Scottish and also served as the location for the British Wreck Commissioner's inquiry into the sinking of the RMS Titanic in 1912.

Embassies

There are a number of diplomatic missions on the road:

 No. 20 - High Commission of Eswatini
 No. 60 - South Korean Embassy
 No. 75-88 - Embassy of Macedonia

Businesses

There are several restaurants in Buckingham Gate. Currently, there is Bistro at the St. James Court, A Taj Hotel London St. James, the Quilon Indian restaurant at No. 41, The Zander cocktail bar is at No. 45, and Bongusto Italian restaurant at No. 75. 

 No. 51 is The Taj 51 Buckingham Gate Suites and Residences, a five-star hotel.
 No. 57 - Savills Westminster.
 No. 58 is Sassoon Academy.
 No. 59 is Swire House, accommodating the Britain–Australia Society and the Hong Kong Association and Society. 
 No. 62 is the Rolls-Royce Group PLC headquarters.

References

External links 
 Hong Kong Association and Society

Streets in the City of Westminster